The Dobra is a right tributary of the river Sebeș in Romania. It discharges into the Sebeș in the village Dobra.

References

Rivers of Romania
Rivers of Sibiu County
Rivers of Alba County